Elias Comfort McConnell (born 1985) is an American former actor and model from Portland, Oregon, known for appearing in the 2003 film, Elephant.

Career 
In 2003, McConnell played a character of the same name in Gus Van Sant's film Elephant. The following year he was photographed by Mario Testino for the premiere issue of elite fashion magazine VMan. In 2006, he was cast in the role of Elie (segment "Le Marais") in the anthology film Paris, Je t'aime which had 22 different directors. In 2008 Elias played a small role as "Telephone Tree #8" in the Gus Van Sant directed biographical film Milk. Followed closely by his 2009 role as "Young Hippy Boy" (Elias Comfort) in Jean-Claude Schlim's Luxembourgian-German drama film "House of Boys". Elias has an upcoming role in the Kevin Foong film "Casting Room" (2012).

Personal life 
McConnell lived in Brooklyn, New York.

Filmography

References

External links

Myspace

Living people
Male actors from Portland, Oregon
American male film actors
1985 births